Anne Shirley Wills  (born 3 October 1944) is an Australian television and radio personality based in Adelaide. Wills holds the record for the most number of Logies won by a person in the history of the awards, winning 19 Most Popular State Personality Logies, and one as producer of Clapperboard.

Biography

Wills was born in Wangaratta, Victoria in October 1944. When she was three years old, her family moved to Ocean Island in the Pacific Ocean, now known as Banaba Island and part of Kiribati, and lived there until the family moved to Adelaide in 1963.

Wills was spotted by Channel 9 executives during the 1964 Telethon Quest, and was offered the job of weather girl on NWS9, beginning in July 1965.

As well as appearing on a number of national television programs such as In Melbourne Tonight, Beauty and the Beast, The Bert Newton Show and Good Morning Australia, Wills has presented and appeared on many Adelaide based TV programs, including Adelaide Tonight, The Penthouse Club, AM Adelaide, Movie Scene, Christmas Telethon, Pot Luck and Close Up with Willsy. She was also the weather presenter for SAS for a number of years and, as of November 2013, has a regular weekly afternoon segment on Adelaide AM radio station FiveAA, featuring celebrity gossip.

Wills is known for her love of over-the-top earrings. Wills also commonly appears in pub quiz nights

Awards and recognition

References

External links

1944 births
Living people
Australian television presenters
Australian women television presenters
People from Victoria (Australia)
Recipients of the Medal of the Order of Australia